Nannenus is a genus of Asian jumping spiders that was first described by Eugène Louis Simon in 1902.

Description
The cephalus is high, the eye region blackish with the area between the rear eyes lighter. The rest of the thorax is brown with a whitish lateral band on each side. The abdomen is small and light yellowish with a vague white pattern.

Species
 it contains six species, found only in Asia:
Nannenus constrictus (Karsch, 1880) – Philippines
Nannenus lyriger Simon, 1902 – Singapore
Nannenus maughami Prószyński & Deeleman-Reinhold, 2012 – Indonesia (Sumatra)
Nannenus menghaiensis Cao & Li, 2016 – China
Nannenus siedleckii Prószyński & Deeleman-Reinhold, 2012 – Indonesia (Sumatra)
Nannenus syrphus Simon, 1902 (type) – Singapore

References

Salticidae genera
Salticidae
Spiders of Asia